Matuszczyk is a Polish surname. Notable people with the surname include:

 Adam Matuszczyk (born 1989), Polish footballer
 Sylwia Matuszczyk (born 1992), Polish handball player

See also
 Matuszczak
 

Polish-language surnames